State Route 619 (SR 619) is an east–west state highway in the northeastern portion of the U.S. state of Ohio.  The western terminus of State Route 619 is at an interchange with the Interstate 76/U.S. Route 224 freeway in Barberton.  Its eastern terminus is at State Route 183 in Lexington Township, just north of Alliance.

Route description
State Route 619 travels through Summit and Stark Counties.  There are no stretches of the route that are incorporated within the National Highway System.

History
First designated in 1937, SR 619 has generally followed the Barberton-to-Alliance alignment that it maintains today since its inception.  With the exception of some minor re-alignments in Barberton, the highway has not seen any other significant changes since making its first appearance.

Major intersections

References

619
Transportation in Summit County, Ohio
Transportation in Stark County, Ohio